Bermuda consists of several islands with an area of  with  of paved roads —  of which are public roads and  are private paved roads. A former railway track has been converted into a walking trail.  There are also two marine ports (Hamilton and St. George's), and an airport, the L.F. Wade International Airport, located at the former U.S. Naval Air Station. A causeway links Hamilton Parish, Bermuda to St. George's and the airport.

In common with the United Kingdom and most British Overseas Territories, traffic drives on the left.

Public transport
Bermuda's Ministry of Tourism and Transport manages the public ferry service, "SeaExpress", and the public bus system.

Bus service

Bermuda is serviced by a bus system. From the main bus terminal in Hamilton eleven bus routes spread out in all directions of the island. As the island is relatively narrow and in most sections has a northern and southern route that are serviced, access to the system is usually within a short distance. The MAN buses have a pink and blue livery and stop at pink or blue markers.

Fares are based on sections traveled, and transfers are available; and visitors can obtain multiday passes that are valid on buses and ferries.

Ferry service

SeaExpress operates four routes for ferries and boats that originate from the ferry terminal in Hamilton. The "Blue Route" services the West End and the Dockyard of Sandys, the "Orange Route" links to the Dockyard and St. George's, the "Green Route" travels to Rockaway of Southampton, and the "Pink Route" brings passengers to points in Paget and Warwick. Fare for travelling by ferry is inexpensive, and allow travel for frequent travel at most hours. In 2003, high-speed catamaran ferry service was introduced.

Private cars and taxis
Cars were not allowed in Bermuda until 1946. Today, Bermuda has a large number of private cars, almost one for every two inhabitants; however, only residents are allowed to drive them. This is largely because, with close to 300,000 visitors a year, allowing car rental on one of the world's most densely populated islands would quickly bring traffic to a standstill, as well as bankrupt the island's taxi industry. Car prices are much higher than in the United States, Canada, and Europe, due to heavy import duties, and residents are also limited to one car per household. The size of cars is also restricted (due to the narrow and winding roads on Bermuda), meaning that many models popular in the United States, Canada, and Europe are not available in Bermuda. Only the Governor and Premier are exempt from these restrictions.

Visitors may only rent small two-seat electric cars or low-power motor scooters; there are no other rental vehicles available; they may also use the extensive public bus system, or take taxis. The highest speed limit anywhere on the island is 35 km/h (approximately 22 mph), and it is lower in built-up and other congested areas.

Railways

Between 1931 and 1948, Bermuda Railway provided rail passenger and freight services between St George's and Somerset in Sandys Parish, via Hamilton. The railway was replaced by a bus service and the line dismantled in 1948. Much of the old railway right-of-way has been converted to the "Bermuda Railway Trail" for hiking and biking.

Roadways

Ports and harbours
There are ports in Hamilton, St George's, and Dockyard (in Sandys Parish). During summer months, large cruise ships dock at the Dockyard (which cruise lines call King's Wharf) at the northwestern end of the island.

Airport
In 2006, the airport handled about 900,000 passengers. It has one passenger terminal, one cargo terminal, eight aircraft stands and can support all aircraft sizes up to the Airbus A380. As at 2006, seven airlines operated seasonal or year-round scheduled services to Bermuda from Canada, the United Kingdom, and the United States. It has a  paved runway.

The airport is served by a public bus service and taxis. There is no car hire (car rental) in Bermuda.

Merchant marine
Bermuda is a flag of convenience, with 160 vessels on its registry as at 2016.

See also

References
Much of the material in this article is adapted from the CIA World Factbook 2009.

External links

Travel: Transport on Bermuda -  Discover Bermuda, Official Site of the Bermuda Department of Tourism